is a series of three albums (one compilation and two extended plays) released between 2005 and 2008 by German independent record company Man Recordings.  is Portuguese for "no wave", in an allusion to the artistic scene that had its beginnings during the late 1970s through the mid-1980s in New York City characterized by heavy experimentation.

Não Wave

It contains a collection of songs from various bands and artists that formed the São Paulo underground post-punk scene of the early 1980s (with the exception of Black Future and Vzyadoq Moe, who hail from Rio de Janeiro and Sorocaba, respectively).

Of all bands present in the compilation, only Ira! would achieve mainstream success during its lifespan.

Track listing

Não Wave Revisited

It features four selected tracks of the original  compilation remixed by different DJs/electronica groups.

Track listing

Não Wave Re-Revisited

Não Wave Re-Revisited is the third and, as of yet, last remix album based on the original Não Wave compilation, released by Man Recordings in 2008. Being the shortest of all three, it features outtakes of Não Wave Revisited, remixed by different DJs/electronica groups.

Track listing

See also
 The Sexual Life of the Savages
 Não São Paulo, Vol. 1
 Não São Paulo, Vol. 2
 No wave

References

External links
 
 
 
 
 
 
 
 
 

2005 compilation albums
2008 compilation albums
Compilation albums by Brazilian artists
Post-punk compilation albums